Ragini (27 March 1937 – 30 December 1976) was an Indian actress and dancer. She was the youngest of the Travancore Sisters; Lalitha, Padmini and Ragini. She started her acting career in the mid-1950s along with her sister Padmini and has acted in movies of different Indian languages, including Malayalam, Hindi, Tamil and Telugu. She also starred opposite Shammi Kapoor in film Mujrim (1958). She played the role of Parvati opposite Trilok Kapoor who played Shiva in the 1962 film Shiv Parvati. The era of dance in Hindi cinema is considered to have begun with the entrance of Ragini and other South Indian actresses. Ragini died of breast cancer in 1976. She had acted in many dramas also.

Family
She was married to Madhavan Thampi. The couple had two daughters, Lakshmi and Priya. Actress Sukumari was the trio's maternal first cousin. Malayalam actors Shobana, Ambika Sukumaran, Vineeth  and Krishna are her relatives. Her husband left for the US in 1972, but returned after his wife became ill from cancer.

Partial filmography

Malayalam

 Prasanna (1950)
 Chandrika (1950)
 Ponkathir (1953)
 Minnunnathellam Ponnalla (1957) as Dancer
 Thaskaraveeran (1957) as Shobha
 Nairu Pidicha Pulivalu (1958) as Thankam
 Krishna Kuchela (1961) as Rukmini
 Ummini Thanka (1961) as Anandam
 Sabarimala Ayyappan (1961) as Mahishi
 Unniyarcha (1961) as Unniyarcha
 Puthiya Akasam Puthiya Bhoomi (1962) as Ponnamma
 Palattu Koman (1962) as Unniyamma
 Veluthambi Dalawa (1962) as Jagadambika
 Vidhi Thanna Vilakku (1962) as Bhavani
 Kaalpadukal (1962) as Chandalabishuki
 Viyarppinte Vila (1962) as Omana
 Bharya (1962) as Leela
 Nithya Kanyaka (1963) as Latha
 Chilamboli (1963) as Chinthamani
 Kalayum Kaminiyum (1963) as Usha
 Atom Bomb (1964) as Sushamma
 Anna (1964) as Anna
 School Master (1964) as Sarala
 Manavatty (1964) as Susi
 Saraswathi (1967) as Saraswathi
 Ammayenna Sthree (1970) as Bhanu
 Sabarimala Sree Dharmashastha (1970)
 Othenente Makan (1970) as Kunji
 Thurakkatha Vathil (1970) as Sulekha
 Aranazhikaneram (1970) as Deenamma
 Achante Bharya (1971) as Thankamma
 Ganga Sangamam (1971) as Philomina/Mini
 Muthassi (1971) as Mary
 Poompatta (1971) as Susheela
 Panchavan Kaadu (1971) as Unniyamma
 Lanka Dahanam (1971) as Maheswari
 Ernakulam Junction (1971) as Malathi
 Naadan Premam (1972)
 Aromalunni (1972) as Unniyarcha
 Lakshyam (1972) as Anna
 Thottilla (1972)
 Aalinganam (1976) as Vimala
 Prem Nazirine Kanmanilla  (1983) as Archive footage

Hindi

Tamil

 Manthiri Kumari (1950)
 Ezhai Padum Padu (1950)
 Chandrika (1950)
 Vanasundari (1951)
 Singari (1951)
 Devaki (1951)
 Andhaman Kaidhi (1952)
 Mappilai (1952)
 Ponni(1953)
 Marumagal (1953)
 Manithan (1953)
Vaira Malai (1954)
Kalyanam Panniyum Brammachari (1954) as Savithri
 Thooku Thooki (1954) as Mallika
 Koondukkili (1954)
Menaka (1955)
Mangaiyar Thilakam (1955) as Neela
 Ellam Inba Mayam (1955) as Bhanu
 Gomathiyin Kaadhalan (1955)
 Kaveri (1955) as Kurathi
 Koteeswaran (1955) as Kamala
 Shiv Bhakta (1955) as Chinthamani
 Madurai Veeran (1956)
 Pennin Perumai  (1956)
 Verum Pechu Alla (1956)
 Baagyavathi (1957) as Suguna
 Manamagan Thevai (1957)
 Karpukkarasi (1957)
 Chakravarthi Thirumagal (1957)
 Mangalya Bhagyam (1958)
 Nilavukku Niranja Manasu (1958)
 Uthama Puthiran (1958) as Rajathi
 Ponnu Vilayum Bhoomi (1959)
 Nalla Theerpu (1959)
 Pandithevan (1959)
 Deivame Thunai (1959)
 Kalyanikku Kalyanam (1959) as  Bharatham Pattammal
 Veerapandiya Kattabomman (1959) as Sundaravadivu
 Raja Desingu (1960)
 Irumanam Kalanthal Thirumanam (1960)
 Mannadhi Mannan (1960) as Dancer at festival
 Parthiban Kanavu (1960) as Valli
 Baghdad Thirudan (1960)
 Punar Jenmam (1961) as Pushpa
 Sri Valli (1961) as Valli's friend
 Senthamarai (1962) 
 Raani Samyuktha (1962) as Amarawathi
 Vikramdhithan  (1962) 
 Kavitha (1962)
 Ezhai Pangalan (1963)
 Parisu (1963) as Shanthi
 Naan Vanangum Dheivam (1963) as Kalaivani
 Chitor Rani Padmini (1963)
 Aayiram Roobai (1964)
 Navagraham (1970) as Akhilandam
 Ethirkalam (1970)
 Aathi Parasakthi (1971)
 Raman Thediya Seethai (1972) as Actress/Dancer of the play
 Poove Poochooda Vaa (1985) as Alamelu (Photo only)

Telugu

Bengali

Sinhala

References

External links
 

Indian film actresses
Actresses from Thiruvananthapuram
Actresses in Malayalam cinema
1937 births
1976 deaths
Actresses in Tamil cinema
Actresses in Kannada cinema
Actresses in Hindi cinema
20th-century Indian actresses
Deaths from cancer in India
Women of the Kingdom of Travancore
People of the Kingdom of Travancore
Actresses in Bengali cinema
Actresses in Telugu cinema
Dancers from Kerala
20th-century Indian dancers